The discography of Christian recording group Point of Grace consists of ten studio albums.

Albums

Studio albums

Christmas albums

Compilation albums

Remix albums

Video albums

Singles

Music videos

References

Discographies of American artists
Christian music discographies